Geryon longipes (colloquially Mediterranean geryon) is a species of crabs belonging to the family Geryonidae.

It is native to Southern Europe.

References

Crabs